St. Ignatius of Antioch Episcopal Church is a historic Episcopal church, located at 552 West End Avenue, on the southeast corner of 87th Street, in Manhattan's Upper West Side neighborhood. It was built in 1903 and added to the National Register of Historic Places in 1999.

In 2021, it reported 239 members, average attendance of 45, and $242,038 in plate and pledge income.

History
The congregation was founded in 1871 by the Rev. Dr. Ferdinand C. Ewer, as part of the Anglo-Catholic movement. The rather unusual choice of titular saint, the first-century bishop and martyr Ignatius of Antioch, seems to have been motivated by Ignatius' emphasis on the centrality of the Eucharist and on the unifying role of the bishop. Ironically, the parish was to have somewhat rocky relations with the bishops of New York in its first several decades due to tensions over its Anglo-Catholic practices.

The parish first met in the former Holy Light Church (New York City) (a parish for the blind), at 437 Seventh Avenue, then in the former St. Paul's Dutch Reformed Church, located at 54-56 West 40th Street and facing what is now Bryant Park, before erecting the present building. The present church, built under the parish's second rector, Arthur Ritchie, was designed to ritualist standards, including features such as a permanent stoup for holy water at the entrance and a built-in confessional. The first services were held in the new building in 1902. The Bishop of New York, the Rt. Rev. Henry Codman Potter, expressed his disapproval of the parish's ritualist tendencies by his absence from the opening; Bishop Charles C. Grafton of Fond du Lac, a noted leader of the Anglo-Catholic party in the Episcopal Church, presided in his stead.

St. Ignatius of Antioch was among the first Anglo-Catholic parishes to welcome the ministry of ordained women. In 1980 the Rev. Ellen Barrett, the first openly gay woman ordained in the Episcopal Church, preached at Good Friday services; she was later invited to become an associate priest of the parish. This move was controversial at the time, and it tended to divide St. Ignatius from many of its sister Anglo-Catholic parishes that were slower to welcome and affirm the ministry of women. Around the same time, the parish moved from using various editions of the Anglican Missal to using Rite I of the 1979 Book of Common Prayer, with the continuation of traditional ritualist features, such as the Angelus, the Asperges, and minor propers chanted in Latin to Gregorian chant tones.

Architecture
St. Ignatius' graceful English Gothic building was completed in 1902 to designs by architect Charles C. Haight, who also built New York's General Theological Seminary. The cruciform interior is made of Roman brick with stone arches carrying a wooden truss roof. The undercroft and several of the subsidiary spaces feature Guastavino tile ceilings. Further enrichment of the interior furnishings was carried out in 1924–1930 under the direction of architect Ralph Adams Cram. These additions include the spire-like cover for the baptismal font, the carved wooden Stations of the Cross, the altarpiece and other furnishings of the Lady Chapel, and polychromed statues of the Blessed Virgin Mary, St. Ignatius, and the Sacred Heart of Jesus.

Music
The church's organ was built in 1966 by Casavant Frères of Québec. In the wake of extensive damage to the instrument caused by the failure of a water tank located above the pipes, the organ was extensively refurbished in 2010–2011. The church is noted for the excellence of its professional choir, which has a particular affinity for the music of the Renaissance. Thanks to its excellent acoustics, the church also plays host to a notable concert series.

References

External links

 Saint Ignatius of Antioch Episcopal Church

Churches in Manhattan
Episcopal church buildings in New York City
West End Avenue
Upper West Side
Churches completed in 1903
20th-century Episcopal church buildings
New York City Designated Landmarks in Manhattan
Properties of religious function on the National Register of Historic Places in Manhattan
Religious organizations established in 1871
Gothic Revival church buildings in New York City
Anglo-Catholic church buildings in the United States